Ajay Pradhan (born 5 February 1980) is an Indian cricketer. He made his List A debut for Sikkim in the 2018–19 Vijay Hazare Trophy on 23 September 2018. He made his Twenty20 debut on 15 January 2021, for Sikkim in the 2020–21 Syed Mushtaq Ali Trophy.

References

External links
 

1980 births
Living people
Indian cricketers
Sikkim cricketers
Place of birth missing (living people)